Saúl Morales Corral (3 May 1973 – 28 February 2000) was a Spanish racing cyclist, who was born in Madrid.

Morales became a professional in 1999, at the Fuenlabrada team. That year his fellow team member Manuel Sanroma died during the Volta a Catalunya. Three years earlier, José Antonio Espinosa, another Fuenlabrada member, died as well. In 2000, during the Vuelta a la Argentina, he was hit by a truck that accidentally came between the riders. Out of protest, several European teams withdrew from the race; it has not been held since.

Morales' only victory was a stage in the 1999 Vuelta a Venezuela.

References

1973 births
2000 deaths
Spanish male cyclists
Cyclists who died while racing
Sport deaths in Argentina
Vuelta a Venezuela stage winners
Cyclists from Madrid